Peter Ungar may refer to:

 Peter Ungar, American paleoanthropologist and evolutionary biologist
 Péter Ungár, Hungarian politician